Dumbo is a 1941 American animated film.

Dumbo may also refer to:
 Dumbo (2019 film), a remake of the 1941 film
 Dumbo (air-sea rescue), ocean search and rescue missions by long-range aircraft
 Dumbo, Angola, more commonly known as Mandume, Angola, a town in Bié Province
 Dumbo, Brooklyn, a neighborhood in New York City
 Dumbo the Flying Elephant, a carousel-style ride based on the animated Disney film, featured at five Disney parks
 SS Dumbo, a coaster trading vessel built in 1944 
 Dumbo octopus or Grimpoteuthis, a genus of octopus
 Dumbo, a body type of fancy rat
 Dumbo, a nuclear thermal rocket design developed in the United States
 Dumbo, a pipeline used in Operation Pluto of World War II

See also 

 Dumbo's Circus
 Operation Dumbo Drop
 
 Jumbo (disambiguation)
 Dumb (disambiguation)